This is a list of some of the breeds of goat considered in Italy to be wholly or partly of Italian origin. Some may have complex or obscure histories, so inclusion here does not necessarily imply that a breed is predominantly or exclusively Italian.

 Alpina Comune
 Argentata dell'Etna
 Aspromonte
 Bianca Monticellana
 Bionda dell'Adamello
 Bormina
 Camosciata delle Alpi or Chamois Coloured Goat
 Campobasso Grigia Molisana
 Capestrina
 Capra di L'Aquila
 Capra di Livo
 Capra di Potenza
 Capra di Teramo
 Caserta
 Ciavenesca
 Cilentana Fulva
 Cilentana Grigia
 Cilentana Nera
 Ciociara Grigia
 Delle Tremiti
 Derivata di Siria, see Rossa Mediterranea
 Di Benevento
 Di Campobasso
 Di Cosenza
 Fasana or Colombina
 Fiurina
 Foggiana
 Frisa Valtellinese or Frontalasca
 Garfagnina
 Garganica
 Girgentana
 Grigia Lucana
 Grigia Molisana
 Istriana
 Jonica
 Lariana
 Maltese
 Messinese
 Montecristo
 Murciana
 Napoletana
 Nera dei Nebrodi
 Nera Rustica
 Nicastrese
 Orobica
 Passeirer Gebirgsziege or Passiria
 Pedula
 Pezzata Mòchena or Valle dei Mòcheni
 Pezzata Rossa
 Pomellata
 Potentina
 Roccaverano
 Rossa Mediterranea or Derivata di Siria
 Rustica di Calabria or Sciara
 Salerno
 Sarda
 Sarda Primitiva
 Screziata
 Selvatica di Galite
 Selvatica di Joura
 Selvatica Samotracia
 Sempione
 Tavolara
 Valdostana
 Valfortorina
 Valgerola
 Valle del Chiese
 Valle di Fiemme
 Vallesana, Vallese or Valais Blackneck
 Valnerina
 Verzaschese or Nera Verzasca

Foreign breeds
Italy also reports to DAD-IS the Saanen and Toggenburg breeds.

References

 
Goats